is a passenger railway station located in the town of Ayagawa, Kagawa, Japan.  It is operated by the private transportation company Takamatsu-Kotohira Electric Railroad (Kotoden) and is designated station "K12".

Lines
Hatada Station is a statin on the Kotoden Kotohira Line and is located 15.8 km from the opposing terminus of the line at Takamatsu-Chikkō Station.

Layout
The station consists of one side platform serving a single bi-directional track. The station is unattended. There is a sloped entrance leading to the back of the station, and a staircase at the end of the platform as a relic of the two side platform era (there was no railroad crossing facility, but there is access to the road that leads to the abandoned platform on the opposite side of the track).

Adjacent stations

History
Hatada Station opened on December 21, 1926 as a station of the Kotohira Electric Railway. This station was established as the closest station to the Sastooka villa area, which was developed by the former Kotohira Electric Railway as a residential and villa area. On November 1, 1943 it became  a station on the Takamatsu Kotohira Electric Railway Kotohira Line due to a company merger.

Surrounding area
Kagawa Prefectural Route 282 Takamatsu Kotohira Line
Former Kotoden Hatada Substation

Passenger statistics

See also
 List of railway stations in Japan

References

External links

  

Railway stations in Japan opened in 1926
Railway stations in Kagawa Prefecture
Ayagawa, Kagawa